Phillippa Langrell (born 4 July 1972) is a New Zealand swimmer who represented her country at the 1992 Summer Olympics and at the 1990 Commonwealth Games and 1994 Commonwealth Games.

Langrell first hit the water when she was three years old and started training a couple of years later, by the age of ten she was selected for the national team for her age and was swimming at senior level when she was 16 years old.

In 1989, she won the South Canterbury Sportsperson of the Year.

Langrell won a Commonwealth bronze medal at the 1990 Commonwealth Games in the 4 x 200 metre freestyle relay, this was after two fourth places in the 400 and 800 metre freestyle events. Two years later, aged twenty she went to the 1992 Summer Olympics in Barcelona to compete in three events, in the 400 metre freestyle she broke the National record in the heats swimming in a time of 4:14.0 and finished ninth just 00.15 of a second from reaching the final, in the B Final she won and again broke her National record this time in a time of 4:12.96, next up was the 800 metre freestyle in the heats she finished fifth, so qualified for the final, where she finished fourth just over four and a half seconds behind the German Jana Henke who won the bronze, again both in the heat and final Langrell broke the national record. In her other event the 400 metre individual medley she again broke the national record but could only finish in 17th place so didn't qualify for the finals. Langrell also competed in the 1994 Commonwealth Games, where she finished 4th in the 800 metre freestyle and 6th in the 400 metre freestyle events.

After retiring she gained Bachelor of Science degree majoring in psychology at the University of Canterbury before graduating from the New Zealand College of Chiropractic in Auckland, Langrell has been a practicing chiropractic since 1999.

References

1972 births
Living people
Olympic swimmers of New Zealand
New Zealand female freestyle swimmers
Swimmers at the 1992 Summer Olympics
New Zealand female swimmers
Commonwealth Games bronze medallists for New Zealand
Swimmers at the 1990 Commonwealth Games
Swimmers at the 1994 Commonwealth Games
Commonwealth Games medallists in swimming
Sportspeople from Timaru
20th-century New Zealand women
21st-century New Zealand women
Medallists at the 1990 Commonwealth Games